The 2022 Duke Blue Devils football team represented Duke University as a member of Coastal Division of the Atlantic Coast Conference (ACC) during the 2022 NCAA Division I FBS football season. Led by first-year head coach Mike Elko, the Blue Devils played home games at Wallace Wade Stadium in Durham, North Carolina.

Previous season
The Blue Devils finished the 2021 season 3–9, 0–8 in ACC play to finish in last place in the Coastal division.

On November 28, 2021, the school announced that long-time coach David Cutcliffe would not return as head coach of the Blue Devils. On December 10, the school named Texas A&M defensive coordinator Mike Elko the team's new head coach.

Schedule

Game summaries

Temple

at Northwestern

North Carolina A&T

at Kansas

Virginia

at Georgia Tech

North Carolina

at Miami

at Boston College

Virginia Tech

at Pittsburgh

Wake Forest

vs. UCF (Military Bowl)

Roster

Coaching staff

Rankings

References

Duke
Duke Blue Devils football seasons
Military Bowl champion seasons
Duke Blue Devils football